Bushy Run Battlefield Park is a historical park that is operated by the Pennsylvania Historical and Museum Commission (PHMC) and the Bushy Run Battlefield Heritage Society on  in Penn Township, Westmoreland County, Pennsylvania in the United States. It was the site of the Battle of Bushy Run fought on August 5–6, 1763 during the Pontiac's Rebellion. The battle was a major victory for the British and enabled them to secure their control of the Ohio River Valley and what was to become the Northwest Territory. Bushy Run Battlefield Park was established as a Pennsylvania State Park in the 1920s and became a National Historic Landmark in 1960. The Visitor Center is open Wednesday through Saturday from 9:00 am until 5:00 pm, and Sunday from noon to 5:00 pm, during the months of May–October. The Visitor Center hosts a museum exhibit entitled, "The March to Bushy Run", a theater, a gift shop and battlefield tours. Bushy Run Battlefield Park is the only historic site or museum that deals exclusively with Pontiac's Rebellion. Battle reenactments are held annually on the first full weekend of August. The park is on Pennsylvania Route 993 near Harrison City and Jeannette.

Battle history
The Battle of Bushy Run was fought between a British relief column under the command of Colonel Henry Bouquet and a combined force of Delaware, Shawnee, Mingo, and Huron warriors. In July 1763, a British relief column consisting of 500 British soldiers was sent to relieve Fort Pitt, then under siege. Under the command of Bouquet, the column left Carlisle, Pennsylvania. The British managed to hold their ground and, after the natives withdrew after sunset, Bouquet ordered a redoubt, made of sacks of flour, constructed on Edge Hill placing their wounded and livestock in the center of the redoubt.

The following morning, after the evening sentries were being relieved, the allied tribes attacked only to be ambushed themselves by the relieved sentries. As the tribal forces were flanked, the warriors fled in a disorganized retreat. With troops under Bouquet, the column dispersed the attackers before heading to Bushy Run, where there was badly needed water. The battle has since been attributed to Bushy Run despite the main fighting taking place in Edge Hill. Bouquet then marched to the relief of Fort Pitt. The battle was costly with 50 British soldiers killed. The confederacy of the Delaware, Shawnee, Mingo, and Huron also suffered an unknown number of casualties including two prominent Delaware chieftains.

Park history
The battlefield was acquired by the state and established as a state park in the 1920s.  In August 2009, the state closed several PHMC museums indefinitely due to a lack of funding as part of an ongoing budget crisis. Bushy Run Battlefield was one of the sites set to be closed. With the help of the Bushy Run Battlefield Heritage Society, the site's volunteer organization, the museum has stayed open despite budget cuts.  On May 5, 2010 the Bushy Run Battlefield Heritage Society came to an agreement with the PHMC to allow the volunteers to staff and operate the museum.

See also
List of National Historic Landmarks in Pennsylvania
National Register of Historic Places listings in Westmoreland County, Pennsylvania

References

External links

Bushy Run Battlefield official site

 

National Register of Historic Places in Westmoreland County, Pennsylvania
Parks in Westmoreland County, Pennsylvania
Open-air museums in Pennsylvania
National Historic Landmarks in Pennsylvania
Pontiac's War
Museums in Westmoreland County, Pennsylvania
Military and war museums in Pennsylvania
Conflict sites on the National Register of Historic Places in Pennsylvania